The 1902 Colonial Conference followed the conclusion of the Boer War and was held on the occasion of the coronation of King Edward VII. As with the previous conference, it was called by Secretary of State for the Colonies Joseph Chamberlain who opened it on 30 June 1902.

Chamberlain used the occasion to resubmit his earlier proposals made at the 1897 Colonial Conference for an Imperial Council made up of colonial representatives which would act as a quasi-Imperial Parliament and make decisions for the colonies on imperial policy. This proposal, along with Chamberlain's idea for a unified imperial defence scheme, was rejected by most of the colonial prime ministers. While New Zealand proposed that each colony provide a special force for imperial defence in the case of war, Canada and Australia both believed this idea undermined self-government.

Chamberlain also proposed an imperial economic union or customs union with free trade within the empire and tariffs against goods from outside of it. The colonies, however, passed a resolution rejecting imperial free trade. A resolution in favour of imperial preference as proposed by Canada was approved and Chamberlain agreed to bring the idea to the British government. However, this plan was not implemented until the British Empire Economic Conference in 1932. Britain had more liberal trade policies than the colonies, making it hard for the British to adopt imperial preference policies without undermining its trade agreements with foreign states.

Theodore H. Boggs, an advocate for imperial federation, described the outcome of the conference as "disappointing."

Participants
The conference was hosted by King Edward VII, with his Colonial Secretary and the premiers of various colonies or their representatives and members of their cabinets:

See also
Imperial Conference

References 

Imperial Conference
1902 in London
Colonial Conference
1902 conferences
1902 in the British Empire